Thionville is a city in the northeastern French department of Moselle. The city is located on the left bank of the river Moselle, opposite its suburb Yutz.

History

Thionville was settled as early as the time of the Merovingians. After the fall of the Western Roman Empire, the region was inhabited by the Germanic Alamanni. It was known in the Latin of that era as Theudonevilla or Totonisvilla. King Pepin the Short had a royal palace constructed here.

The Synod of Thionville was held here beginning on February 2, 835. It reinstated Emperor Louis the Pious and reversed his former conviction on crimes — none of which he actually committed — and deposed the Archbishop of Rheims, Ebbo. The Synod was composed of 43 bishops.  On February 28, 835, in Mainz, Ebbo admitted that Louis had not committed the crimes of which he had been indicted and for which he had been deposed as Holy Roman Emperor.

From the 10th century onward, the area was part of the Holy Roman Empire. It was in possession of the House of Luxembourg until 1462 and then, until 1477, of the Duke of Burgundy. From 1477 to 1643, it was Habsburg territory.

Eskil, Archbishop of Lund, was imprisoned at Diedenhofen (at the instigation of the Archbishop of Bremen?) upon his return from his 1153 pilgrimage to Rome.

The Siege of Thionville in June 1639 occurred as part of the Thirty Years' War. In 1659 Diedenhofen was annexed by France. Fortifications were constructed under the direction of Sébastien de Vauban.

In 1792, Thionville was besieged by the Duke of Brunswick, who unsuccessfully sought to defeat the French Revolution and restore Louis XVI to the royal throne. The writer François-René de Chateaubriand was left for dead during Condé's military émigré expedition against Thionville in 1792.
 
After the Franco-Prussian War of 1870, the area of Alsace-Lorraine was annexed by the newly created German Empire in 1871 by the Treaty of Frankfurt and became a Reichsland. Thionville once again became Diedenhofen and became a prosperous city. Some large neo-Romanesque buildings typical of the German Empire were constructed in the city. The German Army decided to build a fortress line from Mulhouse to Luxembourg to protect the new Reichsland. The centerpiece of this line was the great Moselstellung, a fortress system protecting Metz and Diedenhofen.

The fortifications around Diedenhofen centered on three main forts: the Fort de Guentrange on the northwest side, Fort de Koenigsmacker to the northeast, and the Fort d'Illange to the south. Each position was surrounded by several ditches, with shelters and observation cupolas. A large barbed wire belt defended by machine guns completed the defensive system.

Following the armistice with Germany ending the First World War, the French army entered Diedenhofen in November 1918 and the city was transferred to France by the Treaty of Versailles in 1919, after it again became Thionville.

During the Second World War,  Lorraine was placed under a German civilian administration and was thus once again officially part of the German Reich (though unrecognized by the Western Allies). In 1944, US troops entered Thionville, which has belonged to France since then. In the winter of 1944-45, the Displaced Persons Camp No. 8 was established here.  In the following years it was home to the thousands of former concentration camp prisoners and POWs.

After experiencing, along with all of France, an economic upswing during the postwar decades (trente glorieuses), the heavy industry of Thionville suffered setbacks beginning in the 1970s. The city and the entire region have faced hardships and structural unemployment since then.

Jean-Marie Demange, who had served as the town's mayor for thirteen years, committed suicide in 2008 after killing his mistress with two gunshots in the head.

Economy

The area around Thionville has relied on heavy industry, most notably since the end of the 19th century, due to the presence of iron ore in the area. The first large steel mill in Thionville was opened in 1898. Since the steel crisis of the 1970s, several steel mills have been closed, and only a few have remained active. A growing number of residents of Thionville commute to nearby Luxembourg (Thionville is 15 kilometres from the border).

Transport

The Gare de Thionville railway station offers connections with Luxembourg, Metz, Nancy, Paris, Strasbourg, Brussels, Zürich, and several regional destinations. The A31 motorway connects Thionville with Luxembourg and Metz.

Twin towns
Gao, Mali
Varallo Pombia, Italy
Urbana, Illinois, United States

Administration
Incorporations:
Veymerange, in 1967
Volkrange, in 1970
Garche (exclave of the commune), Kœking and Œutrange in 1970
Guentrange
Elange
Metzange
Beuvange-sous-Saint-Michel

Since the French canton reorganisation which came into effect in March 2015, Thionville is divided over the cantons of Thionville and Yutz.

Neighboring communes

Algrange
Basse-Ham (by Garche)
Entrange
Escherange
Cattenom (by Garche)
Hayange
Hettange-Grande
Florange
Illange
Manom
Nilvange
Terville
Yutz

Demographics
The population of Thionville increased mainly in the first half of the 20th century due to industrial development of the Upper Moselle basin. The economic slowdown and steel crisis of the 1970s affected the town and surrounding area, causing a population stagnation. The population data in the table and graph below refer to the commune of Thionville proper, in its geography at the given years. The commune of Thionville absorbed the former commune of Veymerange in 1966, Volkrange in 1969, and Garche, Kœking, and Œutrange in 1970.

Sport
Thionville FC is the local football club.

Notable people 
 Johann von Aldringen, soldier (1588–1634)
 Joseph Bodin de Boismortier, composer (16891755)
 Antoine Merlin de Thionville, politician (Merlin of Thionville, 1762–1833)
 Nicolas Dahlmann, military leader (1769–1807)
 Senta Söneland, actress (1882–1934)
 Gerhard Borrmann, physicist (1908–2006)
 Ernest Bour, conductor (1913–2001)
 Henry Anglade, cyclist (born 1933)
 Rachid Arhab, journalist (born 1955)
 Thierry Queffelec, civil servant and Prefect of French Guiana (born 1962)
 Francis Renaud, actor (born 1967)
 Carole Gaessler, journalist (born 1968)
 La Grande Sophie, singer (born 1969)
 Eddy Riva, race walker (born 1973)
 Frédéric Weis, Le dunk de la mort (born 1977)
 Nasreddine Kraouche, footballer (born 1979)
 Julien Quercia, footballer (born 1986)
 Benjamin Corgnet, footballer (born 1987)

References

External links

Thionville Official website
 passim

Communes of Moselle (department)
Subprefectures in France
Three Bishoprics